Wanderu may refer to:

Wanderu Inc., a travel booking website
Wanderoo, or lion-tailed macaque